Eduardo Rózsa-Flores (31 March 1960 – 16 April 2009) was a Bolivian-Hungarian-Croatian journalist, actor, mercenary, and alleged secret agent. Born in Santa Cruz de la Sierra, Bolivia, he was known in Hungary as Rózsa-Flores Eduardo or Rózsa György Eduardo. His wartime nickname in the Croatian War of Independence was "Chico".

Early life 
Eduardo Rózsa-Flores was born in Santa Cruz de la Sierra, Bolivia. His father, György Obermayer Rózsa, was a Hungarian Jewish painter, who left Hungary in 1948, moving first to Paris, and, in 1952, to Bolivia with a French ethnographic mission, adopting the forename Jorge. He stayed on, lecturing art, and married Nelly Flores Arias, a Catalan immigrant and high school teacher. A committed communist, Jorge Rózsa moved the family to Chile to escape the Hugo Banzer dictatorship in 1972, but emigrated to Sweden in 1973 after Augusto Pinochet came to power. In 1974, they moved to Hungary. 

Rózsa-Flores attended secondary school in Budapest. After military service he went for a short period of intelligence training, at the Felix Dzerzhinsky KGB Academy  in the Soviet Union. He later joined the Hungarian intelligence services. He attended Eötvös Loránd University (ELTE), earning his degree in 1991. He was the last Secretary of the Communist Youth Organization at ELTE in 1990. He allegedly had cooperated with the Hungarian secret services as a student. His first journalism work was for Cuba's Prensa Latina. In the late 1980s he reportedly joined Opus Dei, after which he embraced Islam.

War
At the start of the Croatian War of Independence, Rózsa-Flores – known then as Jorge Eduardo Rózsa – worked as a correspondent for the Barcelona newspaper La Vanguardia and the Spanish unit of the BBC World Service. He arrived in Yugoslavia in June 1991. While reporting on and witnessing the war there, his car was shot at.

In the autumn of 1991, he joined the Croatian National Guard in Osijek as its first foreign volunteer, and he took part in several battles in Slavonia, mostly defending Laslovo, where he set up the Croatian army's First International Unit.

He later served as a commander of the special forces. He was wounded three times in battle, and obtained the rank of colonel in 1993. Unconfirmed press reports have linked him to the deaths of two foreign journalists also in Croatia at that time, Swiss national Christian Würtenberg (who was in the First International Unit) and British photographer Paul Jenks.

He was promoted to major and then to a colonel in the Croatian Army.
He was officially demobilized on 31 July 1994.

Later life and death

Rózsa-Flores obtained Croatian citizenship. After the war, he mostly lived in Budapest.

Chico was the title of a feature film based on his life, in which he starred.

On 16 April 2009, Bolivian police killed Rózsa-Flores during a raid in the Las Americas hotel in Santa Cruz. Two others, a Hungarian national, Árpád Magyarosi and an Irish citizen, Michael Martin Dwyer, were also killed. Two others, Mario Tadić, a Croatian, and Előd Tóásó, a Hungarian – were arrested. Bolivian authorities said that Rózsa-Flores was the leader of a terrorist group which intended to assassinate Bolivian president Evo Morales. In 2011, members of the Police unit that performed the raid were awarded the Medal of Valor.

After 10 years of investigation the trial is not over and the opposition leaders claim that the terrorism issue was planned and financed by the government to persecute the principal leaders of the opposition as Branko Marinković, they argue that the case is not founded and, based in law, it should be dismiss because the process prescribed.

Last interview
On 21 April 2009, Magyar Televízió (Hungarian television) broadcast an interview recorded in September 2008 by Hungarian journalist András Kepes prior to his last trip to Bolivia, and asked Kepes not to release the interview until he returned or in case something happened to him.

Bibliography
 Mocskos háború [The Filthy War] (Bereményi Könyvkiadó, 1994 )
 Hallgatás hadművelet [Writings from the Yugoslav War 1991-1996] (H-Elen 55 Szolgáltató 1996 )
 Meghaltunk, és mégis élünk [We Died but Still We Live On] (Alexandra Könyvkiadó, Pécs 1998 )
 Hűség – Vjernost – Lealtad [Loyalty: Verses from War 1991-1996] (Magyar Kapu Alapítvány 1999 )
 Állapot: Két háború között [Condition: Between Two Wars] (Magyar a Magyarért Alapítvány 2001 )
 Disznóságok gyűjteménye [Swine Collection] (Magyar a Magyarért Alapítvány 2003 )
 69 titok, szerelmes versek és egy magyarázat [69 Secrets, Love Poems and an Explanation] (Magyar a Magyarért Alapítvány 2004)
 47 szúfi vers [47 Sufi Verses] (Magyar a Magyarért Alapítvány2007)

Films
 Bolse Vita (1996) 
 Vizualizáció (1997) 
 Kisváros (TV series) (1997) as "Karvaly"
 Chico (2001), in the lead role

References

External links
 
 Biography on index.hu / 
 hu.netlog.com/rozsafloreseduardo ERF Blog
 eduardorozsaflores.blogspot.com ERF Blog
 Hungarian Spectrum blog thread on Rozsa-Flores
 website of Eduardo Rózsa-Flores
 Travels with my camera, documentary film at BFI Film & TV Database
 Bolivian who captured 'Che' wanted for questioning at foxnews.com

1960 births
2009 deaths
People from Santa Cruz de la Sierra
Croatian people of Hungarian-Jewish descent
Croatian people of Spanish descent
Croatian people of Catalan descent
Bolivian people of Hungarian-Jewish descent
Bolivian people of Spanish descent
Bolivian people of Catalan descent
Hungarian people of Jewish descent
Hungarian people of Spanish descent
Hungarian people of Catalan descent
Croatian journalists
Hungarian journalists
Croatian soldiers
Military personnel of the Croatian War of Independence
Croatian expatriates in Sweden
Bolivian expatriates in Sweden
Hungarian expatriates in Sweden
Hungarian mercenaries
People shot dead by law enforcement officers in Bolivia
Converts to Islam from Roman Catholicism
20th-century journalists